The Hungary women's national under-20 basketball team is a national basketball team of Hungary, administered by the Hungarian Basketball Federation. It represents the country in women's international under-20 basketball competitions.

FIBA U20 Women's European Championship participations

FIBA Under-21 World Championship for Women participations

See also
Hungary women's national basketball team
Hungary women's national under-19 basketball team

References

External links
Archived records of Hungary team participations

Basketball in Hungary
Basketball
Women's national under-20 basketball teams